"I'm Moving On" is the debut single by Scott Cain, winner of the 2002 Australian Popstars series. The lyrics deal with the singer's decision to end a relationship in which he feels he is being emotionally abused. Backing vocals on the track are sung by Rai Thistlethwayte of Thirsty Merc.

The song was written by Gregg Alexander and is a classic example of his style; the piano chord sequence is central to a steady drumbeat, with a slightly distorted electric guitar lick running in the background, much like his New Radicals hit "You Get What You Give". 
Cain once commented, "I heard [Gregg] on the demo and I thought, 'this is a great song and he's got a great voice'...but I wasn't sure about some of the lyrics at first. They seemed a little corny. But now I think it's a fantastic pop song that's fun and got a great feel to it. It's a song that people are going to like to listen to and at this point in my career, that's the best thing that I could ever have hoped for."

"I'm Moving On" debuted at number one in Australia and sold over 80,000 copies. It was Cain's only major hit as the follow-up, "Crazy People Rock", failed to chart above #39. The B-sides were covers of "When I Need You" by Carole Bayer Sager and "Superstition" by Stevie Wonder. In the music video, Cain rides a skateboard with a gathering of friends in an old warehouse.

Single track listing
 "I'm Moving On" – 3:34
 "When I Need You" – 4:13
 "Superstition" (BNA Remix) – 4:10

Charts

Weekly charts

Year-end charts

Certifications

References

2002 singles
Scott Cain songs
Number-one singles in Australia
Songs written by Gregg Alexander
2002 songs
Warner Records singles